Reassertion of British sovereignty over the Falkland Islands may refer to:

 Falklands Crisis (1770), a dispute over the Falkland Islands between Great Britain and Spain
 Reassertion of British sovereignty over the Falkland Islands (1833) the return of British naval forces to the Falkland Islands in 1833.
 Falklands War, the 1982 invasion of the Falkland Islands by Argentina and subsequent recapture by British forces

See also
 Falkland Islands sovereignty dispute
 South Georgia and the South Sandwich Islands sovereignty dispute